William E. Brock may refer to:

 William Emerson Brock (1872–1950), United States Senator from Tennessee (1929–1931), grandfather of William Emerson Brock III
 William Emerson Brock III (1930–2021), United States Senator from Tennessee (1971–1977)